Martina Bischof ( Fischer, born 23 November 1957 in Berlin) is an East German sprint canoer who competed in the late 1970s and early 1980s. She won a gold medal in the K-2 500 m event at the 1980 Summer Olympics in Moscow.

Bischof's husband, Frank-Peter, won a bronze medal in the K-4 1000 m event at the 1976 Summer Olympics in Montreal, Quebec, Canada.

She also won five medals at the ICF Canoe Sprint World Championships with three golds (K-2 500 m: 1977, 1978; K-4 500 m: 1979) and two silvers (K-2 500 m: 1979, K-4 500 m: 1977).

References

1957 births
Living people
Canoeists at the 1980 Summer Olympics
East German female canoeists
Olympic canoeists of East Germany
Olympic gold medalists for East Germany
Olympic medalists in canoeing
ICF Canoe Sprint World Championships medalists in kayak
Medalists at the 1980 Summer Olympics